Sean Taylor (born 29 December 1983) is a singer-songwriter from Kilburn, north-west London.

Biography

Sean Taylor is a singer-songwriter from London who tours all over the world. He has released eight albums. His last four albums were recorded in Austin,Texas with producer Mark Hallman. The new album 'Flood & Burn'   is released in early 2017

Sean tours regularly with double bass legend Danny Thompson who has appeared on Sean's last three albums

Sean Taylor has toured throughout the UK and played Glastonbury Festival four times, Cambridge Folk festival, Celtic Connections, Beautiful Days, Beverley Folk, Tolpuddle Martyrs, Chagstock, Secret Garden Party, Summertyne Americana Festival, Rhythms of the World, Weyfest, St Ives Festival as well as hundreds of other shows in the UK & Europe.

He has played support slots for Robert Cray, Tony Joe White, Richard Thompson, John Fogerty, the Neville Brothers, George Benson, Tom Paxton, Eric Bibb, June Tabor, Band of Horses, Dick Gaughan and Martin Simpson.

Discography

Albums
 Corrugations (2006)
 Angels (2007)
 Calcutta Grove (2009)
 Walk With Me (2011) on Proper Distribution
 Love Against Death (2012) on Proper Distribution)
 Chase the Night (2013) on Proper Distribution
 The Only Good Addiction Is Love (2015)
 Flood & Burn (2017)
 The Path Into Blue (2019)
 Live In London (2020)
 The Beat Goes On (2021)

References

External links
 

Living people
1983 births